Ellen Ciara Rowsell (born 19 July 1992) is an English singer and musician from North London. She serves as the lead vocalist and guitarist of the Mercury Prize winning indie rock band Wolf Alice. Rowsell is known for her soprano voice.

Early life
Rowsell was born on 19 July 1992 in Archway, North London, and grew up in an Irish community, with her father who is from Dublin. She studied at the Camden School for Girls from 2003 to 2010. At the school, Rowsell wrote stories and poetry, picking up the guitar at the age of 14 and later developing her songwriting using GarageBand.

Personal life
In February 2021, Rowsell publicly accused rock singer Marilyn Manson of upskirting her with a GoPro backstage at a music festival. Her accusations came in the wake of a wave of abuse allegations made against Manson.

Political views
During the 2017 United Kingdom General Election, Rowsell endorsed the Labour Party, calling the vote "a vote between the fair and the unfair." She is a vocal supporter of former Labour Party leader Jeremy Corbyn.

In October 2017, Corbyn encouraged his
supporters via Twitter to buy the Wolf Alice album, Visions of a Life, to try to send it to No. 1 in the UK Albums Chart during its high-profile race against the Shania Twain album Now, saying he was "returning the favour" following the group's support of him during the 2017 general election.

Discography

Singles
As featured artist

References

External links
 

1992 births
21st-century English women singers
21st-century English singers
21st-century women guitarists
Alternative rock singers
British indie rock musicians
English rock guitarists
English rock singers
English rock keyboardists
English women guitarists
English women singer-songwriters
Labour Party (UK) people
Living people
People educated at Camden School for Girls
People from Archway, London
People from Camden Town
Singers from London
Women keyboardists
Women rock singers
English people of Irish descent